Francisco Nappa was a Maltese water polo player. He competed in the men's tournament at the 1928 Summer Olympics.

References

External links
 

Year of birth missing
Year of death missing
Maltese male water polo players
Olympic water polo players of Malta
Water polo players at the 1928 Summer Olympics
Place of birth missing